Henry Grey may refer to:

 Henry Grey, 3rd Baron Grey de Wilton (1282–1342)
 Henry Grey, 5th Baron Grey de Wilton (1342–1396)
 Henry Grey, 3rd Baron Grey of Codnor (1406–1444)
 Henry Grey, 4th (7th) Baron Grey of Codnor (1435–1496), English nobleman
 Henry Grey, 2nd Earl of Tankerville (1418/19–1449/50), English peer
 Henry Grey, 1st Duke of Suffolk (1517–1554), English courtier and nobleman
 Henry Grey, 1st Baron Grey of Groby (1547–1614), English courtier, administrator and politician
 Henry Grey, 4th Earl of Kent (c.1495–1562)
 Henry Grey, 6th Earl of Kent (1541–1615), English peer
 Henry Grey, 8th Earl of Kent (c. 1583–1639)
 Henry Grey, 10th Earl of Kent (1594–1651), English politician 
 Henry Grey, 1st Earl of Stamford (c. 1599–1673), English nobleman and military leader
 Henry Grey, 1st Duke of Kent (1671–1740), British politician and courtier
 Henry Grey (MP) (1683–1740), British politician
 Sir Henry Grey, 1st Baronet (1691–1749)
 Sir Henry Grey, 2nd Baronet (1722–1808)
 Henry Grey (minister) (1778–1859), Scottish minister in the Church of Scotland
 Henry Grey, 3rd Earl Grey (1802–1894), English statesman
 R. Henry Grey (1891–1934), American actor
 Henry George Grey (1766–1845), British Army officer
 Henry M. Grey, English adventurer and author of travel literature

See also
 Henry de Grey (died 1219), courtier of King John of England
 Harry Grey (disambiguation)
 Henry Gray (disambiguation)